William Chisholm (December 8, 1870 – April 28, 1936) was a Canadian politician.

Born in Heatherton, Antigonish County, Nova Scotia, Chisholm was educated at the Common School of Heatherton and graduated in arts from the St. Francis Xavier College, Antigonish. He read law in the office of Colin F. Mclsaac, who was a member of the Grand Trunk Pacific Railway Commission. A lawyer, he was first elected to the House of Commons of Canada for the electoral district of Antigonish in a 1905 by-election. A Liberal, he was re-elected in 1908 and 1911.

He resigned in 1916 and was elected to the Nova Scotia House of Assembly for the electoral district of Antigonish County. A Nova Scotia Liberal, he was a minister without portfolio from 1918 to 1925 in the cabinet of George Henry Murray and Minister of Highways from 1923 to 1925 and Minister of Public Works and Mines in 1925 in the cabinet of Ernest Howard Armstrong. From 1925 to 1930, he was the Leader of the Opposition. He served in the House of Assembly until 1933.

References
 
 The Canadian Parliament; biographical sketches and photo-engravures of the senators and members of the House of Commons of Canada. Being the tenth Parliament, elected November 3, 1904

1870 births
1936 deaths
Liberal Party of Canada MPs
Members of the House of Commons of Canada from Nova Scotia
Nova Scotia Liberal Party MLAs
Canadian lawyers admitted to the practice of law by reading law
Nova Scotia political party leaders